KFH (1240 kHz) is a commercial AM radio station in Wichita, Kansas.  The station is owned by Audacy, Inc.  It airs a sports radio format.  The station's studios and offices are located on East Douglas Avenue.

KFH is powered at 630 watts, using a non-directional antenna.  The transmitter is off West 19th Street, in Wichita, near Interstate 135.  Programming is also heard in Wichita and adjacent communities on 250 watt FM translator K248CY at 97.5 MHz.

Programming
KFH mostly carries nationally syndicated programs from ESPN Radio.  Two local shows are heard on weekdays: Sports Daily with Jacob Albracht and Tommy Castor in late mornings and The Drive with Bob and Jeff Lutz in afternoon drive time.  Some features from CBS Sports Radio are also heard, along with the syndicated Jim Rome Show in middays.

KFH carries Kansas City Royals baseball and Kansas City Chiefs football.  It also airs University of Kansas Jayhawks football and men's basketball games (even calling itself at one point "Kansas Fan Headquarters").

History
(For the history of the 1330 frequency, see KNSS)

KAKE radio
On October 28, 1947, the station signed on the air as KAKE, owned by the KAKE Broadcasting Company, Inc., and aired a full service format. The station's original power, was only 250 watts and the studios were located at 416 West Douglas Avenue.  The station was a network affiliate of the Mutual Broadcasting System and later the Don Lee Network.

In 1954, KAKE added a TV station, KAKE-TV.  It eventually affiliated with ABC.  The AM station got an increase to 1,000 watts by day, remaining at 250 watts at night.

In the 1970s, KAKE switched to a middle of the road (MOR) format of popular music, news and talk. KAKE was affiliated with the ABC Entertainment Network.

KAKZ and KRZZ
In 1979, the TV station was sold to the Chronicle Publishing Company, parent company of the San Francisco Chronicle.  While the TV station kept the KAKE-TV call sign, KAKE changed its call letters to KAKZ on February 1, 1980, flipped to adult contemporary, and was sold to Misco Broadcasting Company. KAKZ would change to adult standards in 1981, return to adult contemporary briefly in 1984, and then to news/talk. New West bought KAKZ in 1985; on October 1 of that year, KAKZ changed call letters to KRZZ, flipped back to adult contemporary, and began simulcasting on KRZZ-FM (then at 95.9 FM, now at 96.3 FM).

KNSS
On September 14, 1987, the station became all-talk as KNSS, adding shows from the ABC Talk Radio Network and NBC Talknet.

KNSS would change ownership in the 1990s; Prism Radio bought KNSS in 1993, followed by SFX Broadcasting in 1997. In 2000, Entercom acquired both KNSS and another AM station in Wichita, KFH.

KFH
On August 30, 2004, KFH moved from AM 1330 to AM 1240; concurrently, the KNSS call sign and format moved from AM 1240 to AM 1330. The reason for this was signal strength; 1330 has a better signal, at 5,000 watts, while 1240 broadcast at 1,000 watts full time.

After the frequency swap, KFH continued with a hot talk format, carrying shows such as Don & Mike and Loveline. It shifted back to a more mainstream talk format in 2006. On May 9, 2011, KFH changed its format to all-sports, affiliating with ESPN Radio.  Programming was also simulcast on 98.7 FM, also owned by Entercom.  It switched its call sign to KFH-FM, giving sports listeners the option to hear sports talk and play by play on either AM or FM.

New studios and new FM station
In early 2015, Entercom moved its Wichita radio stations to the Ruffin Building at 9111 East Douglas.  It was formerly the Pizza Hut corporate headquarters.

KFH gave up its 50,000 watt FM simulcast on October 12, 2016, as KFH-FM became KNSS-FM, simulcasting the talk programming on KNSS. Entercom moved KFH's programming to a 250 watt FM translator station, K248CY (97.5 FM).

References

External links
 
 

FH
Radio stations established in 1947
Sports radio stations in the United States
1947 establishments in Kansas
CBS Sports Radio stations
Audacy, Inc. radio stations